The Ukraine national handball team is the national handball team of Ukraine.

Competitive record

World Championship

European Championship

Current squad
This is the list of 16 players named for the 2024 European Men's Handball Championship play-off games against Faroe Islands and Romania

References

External links

IHF profile

Men's national handball teams
Handball in Ukraine
Men's national sports teams of Ukraine